The 2020–21 Scottish League Cup final was an association football match that took place at Hampden Park, Glasgow on 28 February 2021. It was the final match of the 2020–21 Scottish League Cup, the 75th season of the Scottish League Cup (known as the Betfred Cup for sponsorship reasons), a competition for the 42 teams in the Scottish Professional Football League (SPFL). 

Originally due to take place in December 2020, the effect of the COVID-19 pandemic on scheduling meant that the match was pushed back to February 2021.

Route to the final

St Johnstone

St Johnstone won Group C to qualify for the second round, winning 10 points from a possible 12. They won 2–1 at Lowland League side Kelty Hearts, 7–0 against League Two club Brechin City and 3–1 at League One team Peterhead. In their other match, Saints drew 0–0 with fellow Premiership club Dundee United, but lost the penalty shootout.

Saints were unseeded for the second round draw and were drawn to face Motherwell at Fir Park on 28 November. Motherwell scored first through Tony Watt, but late goals from Callum Hendry and David Wotherspoon turned the tie around and sent Saints into the quarter-finals.

Saints were again drawn away for the quarter-final, against Championship club Dunfermline Athletic. After a goalless draw in normal time, Shaun Rooney scored the opening goal in the first period of extra time. Dunfermline equalised to force a penalty shootout, which Saints won 4–3.

Hibernian provided the opposition in the semi-final, played at Hampden Park on 23 January. Hibs started strongly but goals from Jason Kerr Shaun Rooney and Craig Conway saw Saints run out comfortable 3–0 winners.

Livingston

Livingston won Group H to qualify for the second round, winning the maximum 12 points en route. They won easily in away games against League Two clubs Edinburgh City and Stenhousemuir, 2–1 at home against Championship side Alloa Athletic, and 4–1 against League One team Airdrieonians. 

Livingston were seeded for the second round draw and were drawn to face Championship club Ayr United at home on 28 November. Despite their progress in the League Cup, Livingston had been struggling in the Premiership and manager Gary Holt left the club before the second round tie was played. David Martindale took charge of the team for the first time in the match with Ayr, which Livingston won easily after scoring three early goals through an own goal and two efforts by Jack Fitzwater.

Martindale was still in interim charge for the quarter-final, in which Livi were again drawn at home. They were paired with Ross County, who had knocked out cup holders Celtic in the previous round. Two early goals gave Livi a 2–0 victory.

St Mirren provided the opposition in the semi-final, played at Hampden Park on 24 January. Martindale had been appointed manager on a permanent basis after the quarter-final, and his unbeaten start as a manager continued as an early Scott Robinson goal was enough to give Livingston a 1–0 win. Two days after the semi-final, a Scottish Football Association hearing approved Martindale as a "fit and proper person" to hold a management position. He had previously been imprisoned for involvement with organised crime.

Match

Summary
In the 32nd minute Craig Conway hit an out swinging corner from the right which Shaun Rooney headed down to the right corner from seven yards out, Livingston goalkeeper Robby McCrorie got a hand to the ball to push it against the post and into the net.

Details

References

2021 Feb
2
Sports competitions in Glasgow
February 2021 sports events in the United Kingdom
League Cup final
Scottish League Cup Final
Livingston F.C. matches
St Johnstone F.C. matches
2020s in Glasgow